The Henderson sandpiper (Prosobonia sauli) is a small extinct Polynesian sandpiper shorebird first described in 2020. It was described from subfossil remains found in 1991 and 1992 on Henderson Island, part of the Pitcairn Islands. It went extinct no earlier than the eleventh century (1000s), soon after humans arrived on Henderson Island. It is possible that these humans brought with them the Polynesian rat, which Polynesian sandpiper populations are very vulnerable to, causing the animal to go extinct.

References 

Extinct birds of Oceania
Prosobonia
Birds of Henderson Island
Holocene extinctions